"Kin" is a science fiction short story   by American writer Bruce McAllister, originally published in the February 2006 issue of the Isaac Asimov's Science Fiction Magazine. 

"Kin" was nominated for the 2007 Hugo Award for Best Short Story.

Plot summary

The story is about a small boy named Kim, in a futuristic United States, who the readers find out is talking to an Alien and discussing Kim's desire to have a man killed. It then proceeds to describe the Alien as a race known as the "Antalou" who hail from another planet, likewise noting that interplanetary travel is possible in this story/future. The Antalou was described as an awful creature, with a long neck, and talons, along with a tremendous skull and immense eyes.

External links 
 

Science fiction short stories
2006 short stories
Works originally published in Asimov's Science Fiction